Clem Neeson (4 September 1913 – 22 October 1976) was a former Australian rules footballer who played with Carlton and St Kilda in the Victorian Football League (VFL).

Notes

External links 

Clem Neeson's profile at Blueseum

1913 births
1976 deaths
Carlton Football Club players
St Kilda Football Club players
Australian rules footballers from Victoria (Australia)